The Plan of Veracruz was an agreement proclaimed by Antonio Lopez de Santa Anna at the port of Mexico on December 2, 1822, it was ratified on December 6.

Background  
Iturbide, after declaring the independence of Mexico, entered Mexico City on September 27, 1821 and a few days later Santa Anna entered Veracruz. Iturbide named him Commander of the province of Veracruz, during which time he was in favor of the Empire. But he changed his mind when Iturbide dissolved the Constituent Congress and tried to remove him from his post.

Proclamation 
On December 2, 1822, Santa Anna ruled against the empire of Iturbide and the republic for supporting Guadalupe Victoria. Santa Anna promised to follow the principles of the Plan of Iguala, addressed to the population with the following arguments: 
 He said that when the country had emancipated seeking independence had sought equality, justice and reason.
 Mexico had a representative government elected by a Congress that had been dissolved by Iturbide.
 The aim of his proclamation was to restore a representative assembly of the nation.
 the principles of the Plan of Iguala would be respected and defendant against whom atentase nation against its principles would be considered. An armistice is signed with the royalist forces remaining in the castle of San Juan de Ulua.
 freedom of maritime rotation with the peninsula would be restored.  
The original plan was expanded and was made up of twenty-six clauses. It was ratified on December 6. In the new document it noted that a congress would meet to decide a form of government to continue the principles of religion, independence, and unity. With this plan, Santa Anna lost battles at the beginning of the uprising, but with the proclamation of the Plan de Casa Mata and support of other rebel leaders defeat the forces of Iturbide was encouraged.

See also 
 Independence of Mexico
 First Mexican Empire
 Treaty of Córdoba
 Plan of Iguala
 Plan of Casa Mata

References

Bibliography 
 
 

1822 in Mexico
1822 in politics
Plans in Mexico
1822 documents